Troy School District is a school district in Troy, Michigan in Greater Detroit.

History

Troy School district was formed by consolidating several former school districts in 1950.

In March 2004 the district proposed a $119 bond that would build a new international school, provide a replacement facility for Baker Middle School, and upgrade facilities and technologies in exchange for a property tax increase by 0.99 mill for 20 years. The voting was scheduled for June 14, 2004.

Schools

Elementary schools
 Bemis Elementary School
Barnard Elementary
Costello Elementary School
Hamilton Elementary School
Hill Elementary School
Leonard Elementary School
Martell Elementary School
Morse Elementary School
Schroeder Elementary School
Troy Union Elementary School
Wass Elementary School
Wattles Elementary School

Middle schools
 Baker Middle School
 Boulan Park Middle School
 Larson Middle School
 Smith Middle School

High schools
 Athens High School
 International Academy East
 Niles Community High School
 Troy High School

References

External links

Education in Oakland County, Michigan
Troy, Michigan
School districts in Michigan
School districts established in 1950
1950 establishments in Michigan